Harlan County Lake Seaplane Base  is a public use seaplane base located six nautical miles (11 km) southwest of the central business district of Alma, a city in Harlan County, Nebraska, United States. It is owned by the U.S. Army Corps of Engineers.

Facilities and aircraft 
Harlan County Lake Seaplane Base has one seaplane landing area designated E/W which measures 15,000 x 4,000 ft (4,572 x 1,219 m).

References

External links 
Harlan County Lake Seaplane Base (H63) at Nebraska Department of Aeronautics

Airports in Nebraska
Seaplane bases in the United States
Buildings and structures in Harlan County, Nebraska
Transportation in Harlan County, Nebraska